Giannis Galoupis (born 15 February 2000) is a Greek professional footballer who plays as a left-back for Football League club Kalamata.

References

2000 births
Living people
Greek footballers
Greece youth international footballers
Football League (Greece) players
Kalamata F.C. players
Association football defenders
Footballers from Giannitsa
21st-century Greek people